The canton of Chaumont-3 is an administrative division of the Haute-Marne department, northeastern France. It was created at the French canton reorganisation which came into effect in March 2015. Its seat is in Chaumont.

It consists of the following communes:
Chaumont (partly)
Foulain
Luzy-sur-Marne
Neuilly-sur-Suize
Semoutiers-Montsaon
Verbiesles

References

Cantons of Haute-Marne